The 2002–03 season was Real Madrid's 72nd season in La Liga. This article lists all matches that the club played in the 2002–03 season, and also shows statistics of the club's players. This season marked the return of their purple away kits, and a new shirt sponsor, Siemens Mobile.

Real Madrid returned to domestic league glory under Vicente del Bosque after a 3–1 victory against Athletic Bilbao in the last game of the season, but the club surprisingly sacked del Bosque shortly after winning the La Liga title after he had not been offered a new contract. He was replaced by a surprise candidate Carlos Queiroz. Madrid were also on course to retain their Champions League title (as well as winning La Decima) before being eliminated by Juventus in the semi-finals. In the domestic cup, the club was eliminated by eventual champions Mallorca with a 1–5 aggregate loss.

Players

In

Total spending:  €45 million

Out

Total income:  €0 million

Squad

Left club during season

Pre-season and friendlies

Competitions

La Liga

League table

Results by round

Matches

Copa del Rey

UEFA Champions League

First group stage

Second group stage

Knockout phase

Quarter-finals

Semi-finals

UEFA Super Cup

Intercontinental Cup

Statistics

Player statistics

Goalscorers

External links
Realmadrid.com Official Site
ARCHIVO HISTÓRICO DEL REAL MADRID CF
Real Madrid (Spain) profile
uefa.com - UEFA Champions League 
Web Oficial de la Liga de Fútbol Profesional
FIFA

Real Madrid CF seasons
Real Madrid
Spanish football championship-winning seasons